The Sterling Methodist Church is a church in rural Brookings County, South Dakota. It was built in 1895 in Sterling Township for the Congregation of the German Methodist Episcopal Church of Sterling Township of Dakota Territory. It was added to the National Register of Historic Places on October 19, 1989.

References

Methodist churches in South Dakota
Churches on the National Register of Historic Places in South Dakota
Churches completed in 1895
Churches in Brookings County, South Dakota
National Register of Historic Places in Brookings County, South Dakota